Danny Vasquez (born December 3, 1985 in Miami, Florida) is an American soccer player who last played for Miami FC in the USL First Division.

Career

College and Amateur
Vasquez played club soccer for standout youth team West Kendall Optimist, being named U15 MVP of the 2000 SYL season after scoring twice in the championship match. He was also a stand out player for Miami Gulliver Preparatory. He later played college soccer at Florida International University.

Professional
Unsigned by pro teams out of college, Vasquez played subsequently with a number of Florida-based amateur teams, including Alemannia Aixpress and Soccer Locker.

Vasquez signed with Miami FC of the USL First Division in 2009. He made his professional debut on May 16, 2009, coming on as a substitute in Miami's game against Carolina RailHawks.

International
Vasquez had played with several US youth national teams.

References

External links
 Miami FC bio

1985 births
Living people
American soccer players
Miami FC (2006) players
Parade High School All-Americans (boys' soccer)
Association football defenders
Soccer players from Miami
FIU Panthers men's soccer players